Hideto Tomabechi (PhD, Professor, Adjunct Fellow) (Knight: Cav. di Gr. Cr.) (born 1959) (Japanese: 苫米地英人)  is a Japanese cognitive scientist (computational linguistics, functional brain science, cognitive psychology, cognitive warfare, analytic philosophy) computer scientist (distributed processing, discrete mathematics, artificial intelligence, cyber security).

He developed models for cognitive science, artificial intelligence, computational linguistics, cognitive psychology, mindcontroll (brainwashing), cognitive warfare and mathematical models for human brain information processing.

Accomplishments 

Professor, Adjunct Fellow at Carnegie Mellon University Cyber Security and Privacy Institute, Visual Intelligence Studio (Visual information processing, Cognitive video, Machine learning, Deep learning). Research professor, George Mason University Command Control Communications Computing Intelligence and Cyber Center (Cognitive warfare, Cyber resilience). Visiting professor at Waseda University Nano&Life Research Institute (Nanotechnology and biology). Tomabechi is a visiting professor at the Faculty of Information Technology Science, Nankai University, China. Visiting professor at the Russian National Far Eastern Federal University (Management of Knowledge in Research Projects).

CEO of Dr. Tomabechi Works. CEO of Cognitive Research Laboratories. Chairman of Resilence Japan (Cyber security) Consultant to the Japan Self-Defense Forces. Advisor to Kadokawa Haruki Office. The Better World Foundation and TPI educational program Japan representative. Chairman of the Japan Journalists Association. Owner of Cyzo (magazine).

Knight of the Order of Saint Maurice and Lazarus. Grandcross Knight of the Order of Savoy.

He is also known as a world-class guitar collector. His grandfather was Hidetoshi Tomabechi (linguist, member of the House of Representatives, member of the House of Councilors).

Ambassador of the Dalai Lama. Ambassador of the State of the African Diaspora.

Early life and education 
Tomabechi reported having synesthesia as a child. Because of his synesthesia, his brain experienced sounds as a visual experience. This made it very easy for him to learn and remember. As a child, he was able to perfectly learn and memorize Encyclopædia Britannica, World History, and Japanese History. He was involved in music and learned to play the piano and guitar. Because of his parents' work, he traveled a lot and changed schools several times. As a child, he built his own computer game, which was bought by an American software company. As a high school student in America, his teachers noticed that he had extraordinary abilities in mathematics. At the age of 15, he studied university level mathematics.

He graduated from Komaba Toho High School and then joined the University of Massachusetts Amherst. He received his first degree from Sophia University, then joined Mitsubishi Real Estate. After 2 years, he won the Fulbright Scholarship, which only 1 person could receive each year. He also successfully entered Yale University's doctoral program.

Tomabechi was a Fulbright Research Scientist at Yale University and became member of Yale University Artificial Intelligence Research Center and Yale Cognitive Science Program as a Research Scientist. He took part in research by cognitive psychologist Roger Schank, nicknamed the father of artificial intelligence. Hideto Tomabechi's Ph.D. research topic was: Cognition Models for Language Expressions and Computational Methods (Tomabechi Algorithm). He later applied to the doctoral program at Carnegie Mellon University. He continued his research in cognitive science and computer science at Carnegie Mellon University.

Hideto Tomabechi received his Ph.D in the field of computational linguistics from Carnegie Mellon University (CMU). He was the first Japanese person to achieve a Ph.D. in this subject area, and the fourth in the world. His 1993 Ph.D. Thesis was entitled "Efficient Unification for Natural Language".

Career timeline 
 1979: After graduating from Komaba Toho High School, entered the Faculty of Foreign Languages at Sophia University.
1981: University of Massachusetts Amherst School of Communication.
1983: Graduated from Sophia University Faculty of Foreign Studies, Department of English (Linguistics).
1985 - 1987: Research scientist/fulbright scholar, Artificial Intelligence Laboratory and Cognitive Science Program at Yale University.
 1987 - 1992: Research scientist at Center for Machine Translation (currently Language Technology Institute) Robotics Institute and Laboratory for Computational Linguistics, Carnegie Mellon University. 
 1990 - 1991: Research scientist, ATR: Advanced Telecommunications Research Institute Kyoto for Artificial Intelligence and speech-to-speech translation research.
1993:  Received his Ph.D in the field of computational linguistics from Carnegie Mellon University. Published the Tomabechi Algorithms.
 1992 - 1995: Assistant Professor, Tokushima University, Department of Information Science and Intelligent Systems, Japan. Established the Altered Consciousness Research Center in the university.
 1992 - 1998: VP R&D, Justsystem and Director, Justsystem Scientific Institute. Largest software maker in Japan then with 1500+ engineers. Head of Brain Research Center (Intelligent informatics, Bioinformatics, Man-machine interface, Functional brain science, Speech recognition, Neural networks)
1995: Harvard Medical School Massachusetts General Hospital Brain Function Research, Japan representative.
 1996 - 1998: Director, Justsystem Pittsburgh Research Institute.
1998: CEO of Cognitive Research Laboratories Inc. (Cognition - Brain research, AI and software development)
1998-2014: Japanese government projects leader, Artificial Intelligence, Architectures, Cyber Security, Molecular Biology.
2000-2004: Ministry of Education, Molecular Biology and Genome Information Science Research Committee, Japan.
2003: Visiting professor, Faculty of Information Technology Science, Nankai University, China.
2007: Adjunct Fellow and professor at the Cyber Security & Privacy Research Institute (CyLab) at Carnegie Mellon University. (Visual Intelligence Studio)
2013: Visiting professor at Far Eastern Federal University of Russia.
2014: Independent Consultant to the Japan Self-Defense Forces.
2014-2019: Liaison between Carnegie Mellon University and the Japan Self-Defence Forces. 
2019: Representative of the Order of the Savoy Knights of Japan and Knight of the Grand Cross.
2019: Research Professor, Visiting professor at C4I and Cyber Center Research Laboratory, George Mason University. (Cognitive Warfare, Cyber Resillience)
2020: Visiting professor at Nano & Life Research Center, Waseda University. Molecular biology and nanotechnology research.
2020: Ambassador of the Dalai Lama.
2020: Ambassador of State of the African Diaspora.
2020: Chairman, Resilience Japan, LLC. (Cyber Security)
2020: Government research project in Japan: Next-generation artificial intelligence that evolves with people. (National Institute of Advanced Industrial Science and Technology)
2023: Chairman of Japan Society for Foreign Policy.

Tomabechi focused his research areas in government projects. Tomabechi's main contributions have been leading collaborations between the Japan Self Defense Forces (JSDF) and Carnegie Mellon University. He has also been advising a number of governments in crypto-related policies, and advising private sector institutions around the world, including crypto exchanges and ICO companies.

Brain research, Functional Brain Science, Psychophysics, Man-machine interface 
Hideto Tomabechi was also a head of JustSystems as a professor in the Department of Information Sciences and Intelligent Systems at Tokushima University. At the time, JustSystems was Japan's largest software development / technology company.

In 1993, Hideto Tomabechi became Director of the Development Department. Later, Tomabechi became director of the JustSystems Basic Research Institute, where he was head of research in brain science, psychophysics, psychology, bioinformatics, intelligent informatics, speech recognition and cognitive neuro-engineering. Tomabechi researched the basic functions of the human brain and mind. The purpose of brain and consciousness research were to develop the human machine interface. The main areas of research were altered states of consciousness, hypnosis, homeostasis, brain functions, and functions of the human mind in cyberspace. He was the leader of more than 1,500 people. As a result of the terrorist attack in Japan in 1995, the brain research results were not published because there was a risk that the data would be used by other cults.

In 1996, he became director of the JustSystems Pittsburgh Research Center. JustSystem Company then started a brain research project with Harvard Medical School Hospital in Massachusetts, where the fMRI machine was first used to study brain function. The head of this research on the Japanese side was Hideto Tomabechi.

Tomabechi describe himself as a functional brain scientist. His views on mind and brain science are based on functionalism. Functionalism is the basic scheme of cognitive science. He sees the brain as a complex system of functions organized into several structures of abstractions. He asserts that the human brain does not only exist on a biological level. He said that the higher cognitive functions of the human brain extend to the information space, also known as a mind. According to him, the human mind is a higher abstraction of the biological brain. So Tomabechi's model of the brain is an information processing system that has several abstractions. The higher the abstraction the less information we know about the given level. For example, the higher abstraction of a poodle is a dog. The higher abstraction of a dog is animal. A higher abstraction of the biological brain is the mind, which has specific functions. So brain and mind are not separate entities. Different levels of abstraction of the same system. One of Tomabechi's main areas of research was the Symbol grounding problem at Carnegie Mellon University.

Under his leadership, several artificial intelligence, virtual reality software were produced, and his research has created a new understanding in the field of brainwashing.

Dr. Tomabechi founded the Bechi Unit, the world's first virtual currency at JustSystems, based on Tomabech Algorithms.

Brainwashing, psychological manipulation, mind control and internal representation 
During his brain research projects, he discovered that the human brain and mind can be manipulated extremely easily. Currently, Tomabechi is the most famous scientists in the field of human brainwashing and psychological manipulation. In the 1990s, at the University of Tokushima, he built a virtual reality computer that used hypnosis on subjects to study the memory of the human brain and mind. He discovered that memories can be easily manipulated, that memories can merge and change as a result of certain instructions. This is one explanation for why human thought can be controlled.

Tomabechi was the scientist who deprogrammed the leaders of the religious cult responsible for the terrorist attack in the Tokyo subway. The cult (Aum Shinrikyo) brainwashed its people and they carried out the attacks in an influenced state of consciousness.

One of Tomabechi's basic concepts in the field of brainwashing is internal representation. Internal representation is an internal/ subjective model of reality. He claims that we humans do not see reality as it is. We are only able to see our own subjective, internal concepts of reality as reality. He believes that we ourselves, as well as people outside of us, are able to rewrite our internal representation (belief system, value system, goals, etc.) Certain circumstances automatically create the process of brainwashing. For example, watching TV for a long time, since in this case the internal representation is filled with the information provided by the TV. Then the outside world fades away, and the brain flows into the world of TV informations. In this case, the subjective experience of reality temporarily changes, and homeostasis begins to react to a movie or show. For example, we can react to a film with an increase in heart rate, increased sweating, crying or laughing.

Tomabechi's definition of brainwashing: Brainwashing is when person A changes the internal representation of person B in such a way that it serves the interests of person A. Tomabechi began to teach the opposite of this process, the opposite of brainwashing, called deprogramming. At first, he only taught this to people working in the medical field.

Tokyo terrorist attack (Aum Shinrikyo and brainwashing) 
Aum Shinrikyo was a religious cult founded by Asahara Shoko in 1987. Aum Shinrikyo carried out the deadly Tokyo subway sarin attack in 1995 and was found to have been responsible for the Matsumoto sarin attack the previous year. Asahara's religious doctrines were built from several other religious and spiritual teachings. He used Indian Buddhism, Tibetan Esoteric Buddhism, Hinduism and Christianity for his teachings. In fact, he studied hypnosis early on and was very interested in mind control and brainwashing. Later he only concentrated on brainwashing, which he cleverly hid in the teachings. However, he was not successful in hypnosis, so he used a chemical and technical approach to control followers. On the morning of 20 March 1995, Aum members released a binary chemical weapon, most closely chemically similar to sarin, in a coordinated attack on five trains in the Tokyo subway system.

In 1995, the Japanese Police requested Tomabechi Hideto to assist in their investigation of the Tokyo subway sarin attack. He returned home from America where he was involved in brain research at Harvard University. The series of attacks were carried out in an affected state of consciousness (mostly drugs and hypnosis), resulting in memory loss in the assassins. Dr. Hideto Tomabechi used cognitive techniques and hypnosis, he was able to successfully evoke details of assassinations from people's consciousness, which greatly influenced the investigation. He successfully deprogrammed leaders of Aum Shinrikyo, the doomsday cult responsible for the attack. Tomabechi was one of Aum's greatest enemies, and an assassination attempt was made against him, which was unsuccessful.

Tomabechi has appeared in the media many times explaining the brainwashing techniques used by Aum. He said that Aum had access to CIA files such as MK Ultra. According to Tomabechi, Aum used techniques to reshape people's personalities and memories.

Tomabechi divided the methods of brainwashing of Aum into 3 parts. The first is the Japanese social and cultural belief system, which believes in spirits and the soul. So the first step was already taken, because in the first place, people who believed in the supernatural went to Aum, so they did not have to change their basic beliefs. The belief system of the Japanese people was receptive to the teachings of Aum. The second was hidden in the logic of the teachings. They built teachings that created fear in people. They showed that only Asahara can solve the followers' fears, and they also awakened spiritual desires in people. They taught that society, their parents, their friends are spiritually on the wrong path. Followers were taught that people outside of Aum all produce bad karma's. Thus, they are not allowed to meet or talk to them. Thus, they became more and more isolated and found peace only in the teaching of Aum. The third step was a set of concrete psychological, chemical and technological methods. Asahara gave drugs to the followers, which he hid in the food (mainly LSD). Thus, the followers experienced strong spiritual experiences, which they all attributed to the power of Asahara. Later, he also used technological tools, for example, videos with subliminal messages and a hat that sent electricity to the brain.

Current research projects 
Tomabechi is currently a research professor at George Mason University, Center of Excellence in Command, Control, Communations, Computing, Intelligence and Cyber Center (C4I and Cyber Center). The C4I and Cyber Center at George Mason University is the first and only civilian university-based entity offering a comprehensive academic and research program in military applications of information technology in the US. C4I & Cyber Center projects have coordinated and supported NATO and SISO projects in Command and Control – Simulation Interoperation (C2SIM).

Hideto Tomabechi is researches and teaches in two areas at Geroge Mason University. The first is cyber resilience under zero-trust paradigm. Cyber resilience is a very fast and computationally inexpensive way to recover the original state in the cyberspace.

The second research project is in the field of cognitive warfare. The Cognitive Domain is a new dimension of competition, beyond the land, air, cybernetic and spatial domains. Warfare in the cognitive domain mobilizes a different and wide range of strategies, tools, and techniques. Tomabechi's research project name in the field of cognitive warfare is: Internal Representation in Cognitive Warfare. According to Tomabechi, warfare has moved away from the physical world and the battlefield has entered the cognitive realms, also known as the human psyche. This field includes neuroscience, altered states of consciousness, cognitive psychology, and military science.

He is currently participating in a government research project in Japan also. This research takes place in the fields of artificial intelligence, cognitive science and robotics. Project name is: Technology development project related to next-generation artificial intelligence that evolves with people (VR, semantic, interaction based deep learning, next generation artificial intelligence) National Institute of Advanced Industrial Science and Technology.

Tomabechi currently professor and adjunct fellow at Carnegie Mellon University, Sylab. Where he is mainly involved in projects related to artificial intelligence, deep learning and neural networks.

Tomabechi Algorithms 
Dr. Hideto Tomabechi received his PhD in 1993 from Carnegie Mellon University. He published two high-impact algorithms in his doctoral thesis.

These algorithms are mainly used by artificial intelligence and intelligent information processing programs (Natural Language Processing). Tomabechi Algorithms are fast full graph unification algorithms handling converging arcs and cyclic graph structures. The algorithm was used in Bechi Unit implementations in early and mid 90s which were one of the world's earliest implementations of digital currency. Tomabechi algorithm was used for maintaining monotonicity in a coin data structure.

Cyber Homeostasis, Hyperself architecture 
After leaving JustSystem in 1998, Tomabechi revived a company called Cognitive Research Labs that he had founded during his Carnegie Mellon days, to work on government-sponsored projects. Cognitive Research Labs produced software that's conceptually based on an Artificial Intelligence theory called "hyperself," which Tomabechi has come to espouse after more than 15 years of research work as an AI scholar and functional brain scientist.

Tomabechi developed a near-future entertainment system. The new keyword for this system is 'hyper-reality'. It is the sense of reality that is either equal to or even more than the actual experience of the real physical world itself. Tomabechi developed a theory, called Cyber Homeostasis Hypothesis as a possible construction of this entertainment system. Tomabechi researched human experiential memory and brain functions with virtual reality.

Hyperself architecture is a man-machine interface. This architecture uses intelligent and super fast data miming (including biological information) and expanding one's body into cyberspace.

First speech-to-speech translator artificial intelligence 
Hideto Tomabechi created the first computer capable of recognising and interpreting human speech in 1987 at Carnegie Mellon University. The name of the research project was Carnegie Mellon's complex machine. Carnegie Mellon's complex machine translation process converts human concepts to knowledge-based computer structures to avoid mismatched words. An intermediary language called Interlingua has been developed by researchers at Carnegie Mellon University. The technique has laid the foundation for an accurate machine translator for Japanese to English, and vica versa.

Define buddhist Emptiness concept using tools of modern philosophy and mathemtics 
Tomabechi defined the concept of Buddhist Emptiness using the tools of modern analytic philosophy and mathematics in a publication in 2011 (Defining “Emptiness” September 30, 2011 Hideto Tomabechi)

Theravada Buddhism describes Buddha's enlightenment by the concept of “dependent origination”. “Dependent origination” is based on the idea of “relation generates existence”, which is opposite of the Western notion of “existence is what generates relation”. Tomabechi said: "Buddha blew apart the idea that “relation is generated from existence” which is the hypothesis of Judaism, Christianity and Brahmanism. Relevance of Buddha's idea was validated later by modern mathematics and physics. It's because modern mathematics, physics and philosophy validate “no determinacy of existence” after success of incompleteness theorem in mathematics or after the success of quantum physics in the world of physics. There's no doubt that Buddha attained “dependent origination”under the Bodhi Tree. However his enlightenment was “emptiness” and not “dependent origination”. “Dependent origination” is the only principle to be used in describing emptiness.“

In this paper Tomabechi attempts to define the universe as a “Subsumption Partial Ordered Lattice Universe“ His ideas based on three scientific concept. The first is Partial Function. “Partial Function means “function of division” in short. In Partial Function, defining one part enables its complementary set, the other parts which is notdefined, to be defined as well. For example, defining even numbers, which is a partial function, among the natural numbers also defines all the other natural number which are odd numbers.“ The second is set theory. Set theory is a mathematical theory. "When the word of “set” is used, the order of each element in the set does not carry a meaning. However, when it's called “ordered set”, each element in the set carries meaning.“  The third is called lattice.

Tomabechi describe a universe as a Subsumption Partial Ordered Set Lattice. The highest point in Tomabechi's universe model is Emptiness, which is the highest abstraction of all concepts and extistence. The lowest point is called contradiction.

His theory arranges the abstraction level and information level of all concepts and existences in the universe into a lattice. All existences and concepts have higher and lower abstractions. For example <poodle, dog, animal>. The higher the abstraction, the less information it contains. The lower the abstraction, the more concrete the existence or concept. For example (let's say you live in New York 5th Avenue and you have a poodle) < your poodle, poodles in 5th Avenue, poodles in New York, poodles in USA, poodle, dog, animal>. In Tomabechi's universe model the highest abstraction in the universe is Emptiness because it does not contain any information and does not have any higher abstraction. And the lowest abstraction in the universe is closed with a contradiction point. Contradiction occurs when an extistence contains too much information. For example, the two extistence like cat and dog. Cat and dog have no lower common abstraction level, because then there would be an existence that would be a cat that barks.

Computer Scientist (Artificial intelligence, Computational linguistics, Massively parallel processing) 

 He had published several papers on the LISP programming language, which is mainly the basic programming language of artificial intelligence. At Yale University, Tomabechi built massively parallel processing systems, artificial intelligence systems, etc. using the object-oriented programming language T. After moving to the Faculty of Computer Science at Carnegie Mellon University, he learned LISP, which is indispensable for research on specialized artificial intelligence and natural language processing. Tomabechi learned under Scott Fahlman, the creator of Common Lisp. After returning to Japan, he continued his research on Common Lisp and announced Lispache, an HTTP server written in Common Lisp with the assistance of the Ministry of International Trade and Industry. He also contributed to the spread of CLOS, a dynamic object-oriented model in Common Lisp.
 Tomabechi has been developing P2P technology since the beginning of P2P technology. He developed P2P technologies through government projects. Also, from the mid-1990s to the early 2000s, Tomabechi developed multiple government-budgeted software technologies, and was commissioned to develop Kotoeri program and soled to Apple Inc. 
 Tomabechi produced KeyHoleTV, a P2P-type next-generation video distribution system based on a completely original codec, was used by the Democratic Party of Japan, which won in the 2007 Upper House election.
 He has published papers on LISP, P2P, natural language processing, computer science, neural networks, functional brain science, deep learning, computational linguistics, etc. In the past as a member of Carnegie Mellon University, Tokushima University, ATR (Advanced Telecommunications Research Institute), Cognitive Research Laboratories, etc.

Current academic positions 
 Carnegie Mellon University: Professor and Adjunct Fellow at CyLab Research Institute (Cyber Defense, Machine Learning, Deep Learning, Neural Network) in the Visual Intelligence Research Lab.
 George Mason University: (C4I and Cyber Center) Research Laboratory Visiting professor, Research Professor (MI, National Defense Technologies, Cognition Research, Cognitive Warfare)
 Waseda University: Visiting professor at the Nano & Life Research Center.
Visiting professor at Far Eastern Federal University of Russia.
 CEO of Cognitive Research Laboratories Inc.
 Independent consultant to the Japan Self-Defense Forces.
 Liaison between Carnegie Mellon University and Japan Self-Defense Forces.

Academic Membership 
Japan: Information Processing Society of Japan, The Japanese Society for Artificial Intelligence, The Institute of Electronics, Information and Communication Engineering, The Association for Natural Language Processing Japan

US: ACM, IEEE, Association for the Advancement of Artificial Intelligence, Association for Computational Linguistics, Cognitive Science Society.

Knight and ambassador 
Hideto Tomabechi has been appointed the new Delegate Japan of the Orders of Royal House of Savoy. Tomabechi will also be representing the Japanese Delegates for MILITARY AND RELIGIOUS ORDER OF THE SAINTS MAURICE AND LAZARUS (Ordine dei Santi Maurizio e Lazzaro), SAVOY ORDER OF MERIT, and JUNIOR KNIGHTS ORDER OF ROYAL HOUSE OF SAVOY which currently are active in charity and education programs in Japan.

Hideto Tomabechi is ambassador of the State of the African Diaspora and ambassador of the Dalai Lama.

Television commentator 
Hideto Tomabechi appears weekly in the program Barairo Dandy on the Japanese television channel Tokyo MX. He mainly analyzes scientific topics and comments on various news. It covers topics such as international economy, medicine, politics, and psychology.

The House of Tomabechi 
Hideto Tomabechi also is a Head and House Master of martial art of House of Tomabechi (Tomabechi-ryu 10-dan). House Martial Art of Tomabechi is an ancient Bujutsu with history over 700 years. It dates back to when Ashikaga Shogunate requested aristocratic clans to become warriors who were later called Samurai.  

Tomabechi-ryu has been clan only martial arts for generations. In recent years, Dr. Tomabechi has taught selected members from Japanese Self Defense Forces Special Forces and Japanese Riot Police as exceptions of the house rule. His ancestors include famous Samurais such as Norimasa Uesugi, Shogunal ruler of Kanto region for Ashikaga Shogunate, Tadahiro Okubo, Magistrate (Bugyo) of Kyoto and Nagasaki, and Army Bugyo-nami for Tokugawa Shogunate. He awarded the famous Katana "Kotetsu” which belonged to his ancestors to Chief Isami Kondo of Shinsengumi (Shogunate security police) at the end of Edo Era.

Tomabechi was also trained in various Japanese martial arts including Judo, Kendo and Karate in his youthhood. There was Budo-Ban in Japan from 1945 to 1950 by Supreme Commander Allied Powers (SCAP). Dr. Tomabechi's grand father Hidetoshi Tomabechi, member of Japanese Diet, chief of Kano-Juku and an early instructor (8 dan) of Kodokan Judo for Jigoro Kano was a central figure in having Judo exempted from the ban. Kendo was also released from the ban. Ancient house martial arts were not released from the ban. Therefore, it was important to keep house martial art practice private. Accordingly, in his early youth, Dr. Tomabechi was trained in Kodokan Judo and Keisatsu (Police) Kendo in public and trained in the house martial art in private. He also joined Kyokushin Karate at age 13 during early days of Kyokushinkan.

Currently, he also is an Honorary President of World Kyokushin Budokai. He has 5 dan black belt in Kyokushin Karate.

References 

1959 births
Living people
Natural language processing researchers
Computational linguistics researchers